Time in a Bottle: Jim Croce's Greatest Love Songs is a greatest hits album by American singer-songwriter Jim Croce. It was released after his 1973 death and features sentimental songs compiled from his studio albums. The album peaked at #170 on the Billboard 200 during 1977. Since its original release, it has also been reissued on cassette and compact disc.

Track listing

Chart positions

Personnel
Jim Croce - guitar, vocals

Jim Croce albums
1976 compilation albums